Paulo Pisaneschi (1 November 1930 – 19 April 1980), also known as Paulo Carvoeiro, was a Brazilian footballer. He played in four matches for the Brazil national football team in 1959, scoring three goals. He was also part of Brazil's squad for the 1959 South American Championship that took place in Ecuador.

References

External links
 
 Paulo Pisaneschi at Brazilian Football Confederation
 

1930 births
1980 deaths
Brazilian footballers
Brazil international footballers
Association football forwards
Nacional Atlético Clube (SP) players
Sport Club Corinthians Paulista players
Clube Náutico Capibaribe players
Associação Atlética Ponte Preta players
São Carlos Futebol Clube players
Footballers from São Paulo